The 1998–99 NCAA Division II men's ice hockey season began in October 1998 and concluded on March 13 of the following year. This was the 27th season of second-tier college ice hockey.

After the 1998 Championship many D-II teams raised their programs to Division I including several who had used the Division II level as a stepping stone to the top ranks. With few remaining D-II programs, the tournament dropped the regional selections and took the two teams with the best records, coincidentally they were both members of ECAC Northeast. The division was dealt a further blow when another handful of programs announced they would follow suit after the '99 season. With so few Division II schools fielding varsity ice hockey teams, the NCAA decided to suspend the D-II Tournament at the conclusion of the season. Though Division II ice hockey continues, the tournament has remained mothballed (as of 2019).

Regular season

Standings

Note: the records of teams who were members of Division III conferences during the season can be found here.

1999 NCAA Tournament

Note: * denotes overtime period(s)Note: Mini-games in italics

See also
 1998–99 NCAA Division I men's ice hockey season
 1998–99 NCAA Division III men's ice hockey season

References

External links

 
NCAA